Toyoda Gosei Health Care Center is an arena in Inazawa, Aichi, Japan. It is the home arena of the Toyoda Gosei Scorpions of the B.League, Japan's professional basketball league.

References

Basketball venues in Japan
Indoor arenas in Japan
Sports venues in Aichi Prefecture
Toyoda Gosei Scorpions
Inazawa